Onaway is a city in Presque Isle County, just east of the Cheboygan–Presque Isle county line in the U.S. state of Michigan. The population was 880 at the 2010 census. Onaway is the Sturgeon Capital of Michigan, and there is a lake sturgeon streamside rearing facility on the nearby Black River, where the fish migrate down to the Cheboygan River and then to Lake Huron.

History
This farming community received a post office open on October 23, 1882 with civil engineer Thomas E. Shaw as postmaster.  This office was named Shaw for him. Arriving in 1886, Merritt Chandler had platted the community under the name of Onaway. Chandler took over as postmaster with it changing its name to Onaway on March 29, 1890. On August 18, 1893, Shaw took back the postmaster position and changed the office's name to Adalaska. Once again, the post office was renamed back to Onaway on November 15, 1897. Onaway was incorporated as a village in 1899. Onaway soon became a city in 1903.
At the beginning of the twentieth century Onaway was home to one of the world's largest wooden bicycle wheel manufacturers, producing approximately 65% of the world's wooden bicycle wheels.

Geography
The boundary of Cheboygan and Presque Isle counties is just east of the city.

Major highways

Climate

Demographics

2010 census
As of the census of 2010, there were 880 people, 394 households, and 214 families residing in the city. The racial makeup of the city was 95.8% White, 0.7% African American, 0.9% Native American, 0.1% Asian, 0.3% from other races, and 2.2% from two or more races. Hispanic or Latino of any race were 1.6% of the population.

There were 394 households, of which 24.4% had children under the age of 18 living with them, 34.0% were married couples living together, 14.0% had a female householder with no husband present, 6.3% had a male householder with no wife present, and 45.7% were non-families. 40.1% of all households were made up of individuals, and 22.8% had someone living alone who was 65 years of age or older. The average household size was 2.21 and the average family size was 2.91.

The median age in the city was 43.6 years. 23.2% of residents were under the age of 18; 9.8% were between the ages of 18 and 24; 17.9% were from 25 to 44; 29.4% were from 45 to 64; and 19.5% were 65 years of age or older. The gender makeup of the city was 46.6% male and 53.4% female.

2000 census
As of the census of 2000, there were 993 people, 448 households, and 237 families residing in the city. The racial makeup of the city was 96.37% White, 1.31% Native American, and 2.32% from two or more races. Hispanic or Latino of any race were 1.41% of the population.

There were 448 households, out of which 26.3% had children under the age of 18 living with them, 35.3% were married couples living together, 13.6% had a female householder with no husband present, and 46.9% were non-families. 42.0% of all households were made up of individuals, and 25.0% had someone living alone who was 65 years of age or older.  The average household size was 2.18 and the average family size was 2.97.

In the city, the population was spread out, with 26.1% under the age of 18, 10.4% from 18 to 24, 24.7% from 25 to 44, 21.9% from 45 to 64, and 17.0% who were 65 years of age or older.  The median age was 38 years. For every 100 females, there were 85.3 males.  For every 100 females age 18 and over, there were 76.9 males.

The median income for a household in the city was $20,787, and the median income for a family was $26,786. Males had a median income of $26,932 versus $18,958 for females. The per capita income for the city was $13,552.  About 20.3% of families and 26.9% of the population were below the poverty line, including 37.8% of those under age 18 and 20.4% of those age 65 or over.

Media
All of the following can be accessed in Onaway, Michigan.

Newspapers
The Alpena News is the daily newspaper of record for much of northeastern Lower Peninsula of Michigan.
The Onaway Outlook is the weekly newspaper for the city of Onaway, Michigan, published by Presque Isle Newspaper, Inc.
The Presque Isle County Advance is the weekly newspaper of Presque Isle County, published by Presque Isle Newspaper, Inc.

Television
Channel 4:WTOM-TV "TV 7&4" (NBC) (Cheboygan) (simulcasted in channel 7, Harrietta)
Channel 6:WCML "CMU Public Television" (PBS) (Montmorency Township)
Channel 8:WGTQ "ABC 29&8" (ABC) (Goetzville) (simulcasted in channel 29, Kalkaska)
Channel 10:WWUP-TV "9&10 News" (CBS) (Goetzville) (simulcasted in channel 9, Tustin)
Channel 11:WBKB-TV "Channel 11 News" (CBS) (Alpena)

Radio

FM

AM

Government 
 Form of government: Council/Manager
 U.S. Rep: Bart Stupak
 State Sen: Walter North
 State Rep: Sue Allor
 Council: Jessie Horrocks, Ron Horrocks, Michael Benson, Jerome Bischer
 Mayor: Charles Abshagen

Transportation
Leo E. Goetz County Airport (permanently closed)

The nearest commercial airports to Onaway are Alpena County Regional Airport, Cherry Capital Airport (Traverse City) and Pellston Airport.

Michigan State Trunklines7

 (southern terminus)
Michigan Department of Natural Resources trails
North Eastern State Trail

References

Sources

Cities in Presque Isle County, Michigan